Aboubacar Ibrahima Toungara (born 15 November 1994) is a Malian footballer who plays for Bulgarian club Arda Kardzhali. He was part of the youth team that made it to the group stage at the 2013 FIFA U-20 World Cup with the Mali squad.

References

External links
 

1994 births
Living people
Malian footballers
Mali under-20 international footballers
Association football midfielders
Sportspeople from Bamako
Chabab Atlas Khénifra players
PFC Beroe Stara Zagora players
FC Arda Kardzhali players
First Professional Football League (Bulgaria) players
Malian expatriate footballers
Expatriate footballers in Morocco
Expatriate footballers in Bulgaria
21st-century Malian people